Al-Zour is an area in Kuwait. It is located in the southern part of the country near Wafra. The Al Zour Refinery is planned to be built in the area by Kuwait Integrated Petrochemical Industries Company; it will be the largest in the Middle East.

See also 
 Kuwait's Fifth District
 Al Zour Refinery

Geography of Kuwait